The ornate shiner (Codoma ornata)  is a cyprinid fish endemic to Mexico. It is the only species in its genus.

References

Leuciscinae
Fish of Central America
Taxa named by Charles Frédéric Girard
Fish described in 1856